Demirözü Dam is a dam in Bayburt Province, Turkey, built between 1996 and 2003. The development was backed by the Turkish State Hydraulic Works.

See also
List of dams and reservoirs in Turkey

References

External links
DSI directory, State Hydraulic Works (Turkey), Retrieved December 16, 2009

Dams in Bayburt Province